Cabin Run may refer to:

Cabin Run, Columbia County, Pennsylvania, a stream
Cabin Run (Tohickon Creek, Delaware River), a stream in Bucks County, Pennsylvania
Cabin Run Covered Bridge, a covered bridge crossing Cabin Run, Bucks County, Pennsylvania